Biswanath Pattnaik was a well-known veteran Gandhian, Sarvodaya and Bhoodan leader. He won the Jamnalal Bajaj Award in 2008 for his social, medical, and education work in the tribe-dominated areas of Kujendri and Baliguda, Odisha state, India.

Early life
Biswanath Pattnaik was born on 11 November 1916 in Kumarada, a village of what was then Ganjam district. Biswanath studied in his village school. His father, Upendra Pattnaik, died when he was a child. After this, his grandfather, Ghanashyam Pattnaik, looked after him. Later, he traveled to Srikakulam in Andhra Pradesh where he studied until class 8 before dropping out. 

At the age of 17, he started his career as an informal teacher at his village school with a monthly salary of seven rupees. It was there that he was inspired by the Gandhian Sri Gopabandhu Choudhury, and started working as his assistant. Sri Choudhury sent him to Koraput to expand the Khadi movement (as part of the Swadeshi, or self-sufficiency movement). Sri Pattnaik arrived in Kujendri in 1940.

Constructive work
Sri Pattnaik joined the movement for the formation of a separate Utkal (Odisha) state. He was a part of larger nationalist and independence movements that were occurring in Odisha around the same time. He started his work in Banabasi Seva Samiti (founded by Sri Gopabandhu Choudhury in 1972) and took up issues like education and upliftment of the poor tribespeople. The Samiti ran several residential schools for the tribal children, orphanages and old age homes. 

He helped popularize the Khadi movement and in Koraput that he was called Koraputia Gandhi. He also campaigned against discrimination against the Dalit and the institution of "untouchability." Under his leadership and the direction of Krupasindhu Hota, people of the Scheduled Castes and Scheduled Tribes entered the Hindu temple at Kujendri. A close associate of Vinoba Bhave, Pattnaik was better known as "agnya" ('Sir' in Oriya) by the people around him. 

Later he joined the Quit India movement. He started the Bhoodan movement in the Koraput area which was successful in bringing change to the region.

Awards
Sri Pattnaik received the following awards amongst others:

Best Social Worker Award from Bharatiya Adimajati Sevak Sangh, 1995
Justice Rajksishore Das Samman, 1996
Sarala Award, 2002
Rajiv Gandhi Sadvabana Award, 2003
Pradyumna Bala Sammana
Kondhamala Citizen Forum Felicitation Award
Jamnalal Bajaj Award, 2008

Film maker Ajaya Bharadwaj has started making a documentary film on the work of Biswanath Pattnaik.

Death
Shri Pattnaik died on 29 May 2010 at Baliguda, Kandhamal district, Odisha. He was 93.

See also
Gandhism
Life history of Biswanath Pattnaik

References

Gandhians
Indian independence activists from Odisha
1916 births
2010 deaths
People from Odisha
People from Ganjam district